Khadem Hossain Khan (1922-1992) was a classical musician in Bangladesh.

Early life
Khan was born in Shibpur, Brahmanbaria, East Bengal, British Raj on 1922. He trained under his father Nayeb Ali Khan. He learned how to play the tabla under his uncle, Fakir Aftabuddin Khan. He learned the sitar from Ustad Ayet Ali Khan and Allauddin Khan. He studied in Kolkata under Zamindar of Gouripur, Birendra Kishore Roy Chowdhury and  Ustad Dabir Khan.

Career
Khan moved to Dhaka before the Partition of India where he worked in Dhaka Radio. He joined Radio Pakistan after the Partition. In 1971, after the Independence of Bangladesh, he was made the chief music producer of Bangladesh Betar. He served as the director of the dance troop of Bulbul Chowdhury. He was one of the founders of Bulbul Lalitakala Academy and was the head of the Department of Instrumental Music. He was the Managing Director of Alauddin Little Orchestra Group. In 1980, The Government of Bangladesh awarded him the Independence Day Award.

Death
Khan died on 1992.

References

1922 births
1992 deaths
People from Brahmanbaria district
Recipients of the Independence Day Award
Bangladeshi composers
20th-century Bangladeshi male singers
20th-century Bangladeshi singers
Hindustani instrumentalists
Sitar players
Hindustani composers